The Branford Boase Award is a British literary award presented annually to an outstanding children's or young-adult novel by a first-time writer; "the most promising book for seven year-olds and upwards by a first time novelist." The award is shared by both the author and their editor, which The Oxford Companion to Children's Literature noted is unusual for literary awards.

History 
Wendy Boase, Editorial Director of Walker Books, and Henrietta Branford worked together to produce a great number of books. Both Boase and Branford died in 1999 of cancer. The Branford Boase Award was created to celebrate and commemorate their names and memories and to encourage new talent in writing, which they worked for. The awards were a joint idea by Julia Eccleshare and Anne Marley who both had jobs to do with books. The Branford Boase Award runs alongside the Henrietta Branford Writing Competition for young writers (under 19).

Winners receive a hand-crafted box with the Branford Boase Award logo and a cheque for £1,000. The prize and the official website are currently sponsored by the best-selling children's writer Jacqueline Wilson. The award is given to both the author and their editor, "in recognition of the editor’s role in bringing a debut author to market."

Reception 
The Oxford Companion to Children's Literature has written that the award's "success in talent-spotting has been impressive, consistently recognising debut works by writers who subsequently go on to achieve great things—among them Marcus Sedgwick, Mal Peet, Meg Rosoff, B. R. Collins, Frances Hardinge, Sally Prue, Kevin Brooks and Siobhan Dowd."

In 2018 judges for the competition criticized the amount of family dramas nominated for the award, stating that it was formulaic and showed a lack of diversity. Judge Philip Womack stated that at least third of the books fell into this category and that they all had a “very similar narrative: there’s an ill child at home, who notices something odd, and is probably imagining it, but not telling the reader. They’re all in the first person, all in the present tense, all of a type". The Bookseller commented on the shortlist submissions for 2022, noting that there was a wider variety of authors and that they were more ambitious, which they felt resulted in "freshly told stories which reflect the writers’ understanding of the needs of today’s readers and the certainty of authors and publishers that those readers want to read outside their own experiences." Publishing Perspectives praised the 2022 shortlist for including a strong selection of books that appeal to both boys and girls.

Winners

Shortlists 

 2000 
 Dominic Barker – Sharp Stuff – Transworld
 Gus Clarke – Can We Keep It, Dad? – Andersen Press
 Richard Kidd – The Giant Goldfish Robbery – Transworld
 Paul May – Troublemakers – Transworld
 Stephen Pots – Hunting Gumnor – Egmont
 Louise Rennison – Angus, Thongs and Full-Frontal Snogging – Piccadilly
 Katherine Roberts – Song Quest – Chicken House
 
2001

 Nick Manns – Control Shift – Hodder
 William Nicholson – The Wind Singer – Egmont
 Hazel Riley – Thanis – OUP
 Marcus Sedgwick – Floodland – Orion
 
2002

 Emma Barnes – Jessica Haggerthwaite: Witch Dispatcher – Bloomsbury
 Adele Minchin – The Beat Goes On – Women's Press
 Sally Prue – Cold Tom – OUP
 Bali Rai – (Un)arranged Marriage – Corgi
 Philip Reeve – Mortal Engines – Scholastic
 
2003

 Julia Bell, Massive – Pan Macmillan
 Kevin Brooks – Martyn Pig – Chicken House
 Patricia Elliott – Ice Boy – Hodder
 Richard MacSween – The Firing – Andersen
 Livi Michael – Frank and the Black Hamster of Narkiz – Puffin
 Simon Mason – The Quigleys – David Fickling Books
 Nicky Singer – Feather Boy – HarperCollins
 
2004

 Steve Augarde – The Various – David Fickling Books
 Graham Gardner – Inventing Elliott – Dolphin
 Julie Hearn – Follow Me Down – OUP
 L. S. Matthews – Fish – Hodder
 Mal Peet – Keeper – Walker
 Eleanor Updale – Montmorency – Scholastic
 
2005

 Alison Allen-Gray – Unique – OUP
 Frank Cottrell Boyce – Millions – Macmillan
 Cathy Cassidy – Dizzy – Puffin Books
 John Dougherty – Zeus on the Loose – Random House
 Michelle Paver – Wolf Brother – Orion
 Meg Rosoff –  How I Live Now – Puffin
 Leslie Wilson – Last Train from Kummersdorf – Faber
 
2006

 Nicola Davies – Home – Walker
 Joshua Doder – A Dog Called Grk – Andersen Press
 Frances Hardinge – Fly By Night – Macmillan Children's Books
 Ann Kelley – The Burying Beetle – Luath Press
 Sarah Singleton – Century – Simon & Schuster
 Anthony McGowan – Hellbent – Doubleday
 Cat Weatherill – Barkbelly – Puffin
 
2007

 Linda Buckley-Archer – Gideon the Cutpurse – Simon & Schuster
 Siobhan Dowd – A Swift Pure Cry – David Fickling Books
 Charlie Fletcher – Stoneheart – Hodder
 Ally Kennen – Beast – Scholastic
 Sian Pattenden – The Awful Tale of Agatha Bilke – Short Books
 Andy Stanton – You're a Bad Man, Mr Gum – Egmont
 Tabitha Suzuma – A Note of Madness – Random House
 
2008

 Atinuke – Anna Hibiscus – Walker
 L. Brittney – Nathan Fox: Dangerous Times – Macmillan
 Sharon Dogar – Waves – Chicken House
 Jenny Downham – Before I Die – David Fickling Books
 Sarah Mussi – The Door of No Return – Hodder
 Jenny Valentine – Finding Violet Park – HarperCollins
 
2009

 Jeremy de Quidt – The Toymaker – David Fickling Books
 B. R. Collins – The Traitor Game – Bloomsbury Publishing
 Sally Nicholls – Ways to Live Forever – Scholastic Press
 Patrick Ness – The Knife of Never Letting Go – Walker Books
 Katy Moran – Bloodline – Walker Books
 Marie-Louise Jensen – Between Two Seas – Oxford University Press
 Emily Diamand – Flood Child (originally published as Reavers' Ransom) – Chicken House
 
2010

 Sarwat Chadda – Devil's Kiss – Puffin
 Lucy Christopher – Stolen – Chicken House
 Damian Kelleher – Life, Interrupted – Piccadilly Press
 Anna Perera – Guantanamo Boy – Puffin
 Dan Tunstall – Big and Clever – Five Leaves
 Rachel Ward – Numbers – Chicken House
 Victor Watson – Paradise Barn – Catnip
 
2011
 J P Buxton – I Am the Blade – edited by Beverley Birch, Hachette
 Keren David – When I Was Joe – edited by Maurice Lyon, Frances Lincoln
 Candy Gourlay – Tall Story – edited by Bella Pearson, David Fickling Books
 Gregory Hughes – Unhooking the Moon – edited by Roisin Heycock, Quercus
 Jason Wallace – Out of Shadows – edited by Charlie Sheppard, Andersen Press
 Pat Walsh – The Crowfield Curse – edited by Imogen Cooper, Chicken House
 
2012

 Lindsey Barraclough – Long Lankin – edited by Annie Eaton and Natalie Doherty (Bodley Head)
 Phil Earle – Being Billy – edited by Shannon Park (Puffin)
 Lissa Evans – Small Change for Stuart – edited by Annie Eaton and Ruth Knowles (Bodley Head)
 Ali Lewis – Everybody Jam – edited by Charlie Sheppard (Andersen Press)
 Gill Lewis – Sky Hawk – edited by Liz Cross (OUP)
 Irfan Master – A Beautiful Lie – edited by Emma Matthewson (Bloomsbury)
 Annabel Pitcher – My Sister Lives on the Mantelpiece – edited by Fiona Kennedy (Orion)
 
2013

 S. D. Crockett – After the Snow – edited by Emma Young (Macmillan)
 Natasha Farrant – The Things We Did for Love – edited by Julia Heydon-Wells (Faber)
 Edward Hogan – Daylight Saving – edited by Mara Bergman (Walker)
 Wendy Meddour – A Hen in the Wardrobe – edited by Janetta Otter-Barry (Frances Lincoln)
 Andrew Prentice & Jonathan Weil – Black Arts – edited by Simon Mason (David Fickling)
 Dave Shelton – A Boy and a Bear in a Boat – edited by David Fickling (David Fickling)
 Lydia Syson – A World Between Us – edited by Sarah Odedina (Hot Key)

2014

 Natasha Carthew – Winter Damage – edited by Rebecca McNally (Bloomsbury)
 C.J. Flood – Infinite Sky – edited by Venetia Gosling (Simon & Schuster)
 Rob Lloyd Jones – Wild Boy – edited by Mara Bergman and Lucy Early (Walker)
 Julie Mayhew – Red Ink – edited by Emily Thomas (Hot Key)
 Ross Montgomery – Alex the Dog and the Unopenable Door – edited by Rebecca Lee and Susila Baybars (Faber)
 Fletcher Moss – The Poison Boy – edited by Imogen Cooper and Barry Cunningham (Chicken House)
 Holly Smale – Geek Girl – edited by Lizzy Clifford (HarperCollins)

2015

 Sara Crowe – Bone Jack – edited by Charlie Sheppard and Eloise Wilson (Andersen Press)
 Clare Furniss – The Year of the Rat – edited by Jane Griffiths (Simon and Schuster)
 Giancario Gemin – Cowgirl – edited by Kirstie Stansfield (Nosy Crow)
 Sally Green – Half Bad – edited by Ben Horslen (Puffin)
 Non Pratt – Trouble – edited by Annalie Grainger and Denise Johnstone-Burt (Walker Books)
 Rosie Rowell – Leopold Blue – edited by Katie Thomas (Hot Key Books)
 Rupert Wallis – The Dark Inside – edited by Jane Griffiths (Simon and Schuster)

2016

 Horatio Clare – Aubrey and the Terrible Yoot – edited by Penny Thomas (Firefly Press)
 David Hofmeyr – Stone Rider – edited by Ben Horslen and Tig Wallace (Penguin Random House)
 Will Mabbitt – The Unlikely Adventures of Mabel Jones – edited by Ben Horslen, illustrations by Ross Collins (Penguin Random House)
 David Solomon – My Brother is a Superhero – edited by Kirsty Stansfield (Nosy Crow)
 Ross Welford – Time Travelling with a Hamster – edited by Nick Lake (HarperCollins Children’s Books)
 Lisa Williamson – The Art of Being Normal – edited by Bella Pearson (David Fickling Books)

2017

 Peter Bunzi – Cogheart – edited by Rebecca Hill (Usborne)
 Amber Lee Dodd – We Are Giants – edited by Niamh Mulvey, (Quercus)
 Sue Durrant – Little Bits of Sky – edited by Kirsty Stansfield (Nosy Crow)
 Stewart Foster – The Bubble Boy – edited by Rachel Mann (Simon and Schuster)
 Kiran Millwood Hargrave – The Girl of Ink and Stars – edited by Rachel Leyshon (Chicken House)
 M. G. Leonard – Beetle Boy – edited by Barry Cunningham and Rachel Leyshon (Chicken House)
 Martin Stewart – Riverkeep – edited by Shannon Cullen and Sharyn November (Penguin Random House)

2018

 Yaba Badoe – A Jigsaw of Fire and Stars – edited by Fiona Kennedy (Head of Zeus: Zephyr)
 Sharon Cohen – The Starman and Me – edited by Sarah Lambert (Quercus Children’s Books)
 Chloe Daykin – Fish Boy – edited by Leah Thaxton (Faber)
 Elys Dolan – Knighthood for Beginners – edited by Clare Whitston and Elv Moody (Oxford)
 Mitch Johnson – Kick – edited by Rebecca Hill and Becky Walker (Usborne)
 Tony Mitton – Potter's Boy – edited by Anthony Hinton (David Fickling Books)
 Jacob Sager Weinstein – The City of Secret Rivers – edited by Gill Evans (Walker Books)

2019

 Sophie Anderson – The House with Chicken Legs – edited by Rebecca Hill and Becky Walker (Usborne)
 P. G. Bell – The Train to Impossible Places – edited by Rebecca Hill and Becky Walker (Usborne)
 Mel Darbon – Rosie Loves Jack – edited by Sarah Stewart (Usborne)
 Rowena House – The Goose Road – edited by Mara Bergman (Walker Books)
 Matt Killeen – Orphan Monster Spy – edited by Sarah Stewart and Kendra Levin (Usbourne)
 Muhammad Khan – I Am Thunder – edited by Lucy Pearse (Macmillan)
 Onjali Q Raúf – The Boy at the Back of the Class – edited by Lena McCauley, (Orion)

2020

 Humza Arshad & Henry White – Little Badman and the Invasion of the Killer Aunties – edited by Sharan Matharu and Holly Harris (Puffin Books)
 Katya Balen – The Space We're In – edited by Lucy Mackay-Sim (Bloomsbury) 
 Aisha Bushby – A Pocketful of Stars – edited by Liz Bankes and Sarah Levison (Egmont)
 Liz Hyder – Bearmouth – edited by Sara Odedina (Pushkin Press)
 Holly Jackson – A Good Girl's Guide to Murder – edited by Lindsey Heaven (Electric Monkey)
 Jamie Littler – Frostheart – edited by Naomi Colthurst (Puffin)
 Emma Smith-Barton – The Million Pieces of Neena Gill – edited by Naomi Colthurst (Penguin)

2021

 Kereen Getten – When Life Gives You Mangoes – edited by Sara Odedina (Pushkin)
 Finbar Hawkins – Witch – edited by Fiona Kennedy (Zephyr)
 Danielle Jawando – And the Stars Were Burning Brightly – edited by Jane Griffiths (Simon and Schuster)
 Elle McNicoll – A Kind of Spark – edited by Eishar Brar (Knights Of)
 Manjeet Mann – Run, Rebel – edited by Carmen McCullough (Penguin) 
 Struan Murray – Orphans of the Tide – edited by Ben Horslen (Puffin)
 Jenny Pearson – The Super Miraculous Journey of Freddie Yates – edited by Rebecca Hill and Becky Walker (Usborne) 

2022

 Natasha Bowen – Skin of the Sea – edited by Carmen McCullough and Tricia Lin (Penguin)
 Maisie Chan – Danny Chung Does Not Do Maths – edited by Georgia Murray (Piccadilly)
 Femi Fadugba – The Upper World – edited by Emma Jones, Stephanie Stein & Asmaa Isse (Penguin)
 Luke Palmer – Grow – edited by Penny Thomas (Firefly Press)
 Lesley Parr – The Valley of Lost Secrets – edited by Zoë Griffiths (Bloomsbury)
 Ros Roberts – Digger and Me – edited by Ella Whiddett and Ruth Bennett (Little Tiger)
 Helen Rutter – The Boy Who Made Everyone Laugh – edited by Lauren Fortune (Scholastic)
 Nadia Shireen – Grimwood'' – edited by Ali Dougal (Simon and Schuster)

References

External links  

  

Awards established in 2000
2000 establishments in England
British children's literary awards
First book awards